A tub or quarry tub is a type of railway or tramway wagon used in quarries and other industrial locations for the transport of minerals (such as coal, sand, ore, clay and stone) from a quarry or mine face to processing plants or between various parts of an industrial site. This type of wagon may be small enough for one person to push, or designed for haulage by a horse, or for connection in a train hauled by a locomotive. The tubs are designed for ease of emptying, usually by a side-tipping action. This type of rail vehicle is now mainly obsolete, its function having been mostly replaced by conveyor belts.

See also 

 British narrow gauge railways
 Chaldron
 Corf
 Mine car
 Minecart
 Mineral wagon
 Mine railway

References

British railway wagons
Mining equipment
Freight rolling stock